Aegeae or Aigeai may refer to:
 Aegeae (Macedon), ancient capital of Macedon
 Aegeae (Cilicia), ancient town of Cilicia, now in Turkey
 Aegeae, Esfahan Province, a city in Isfahan Province, Iran